Angelito Toledo "Hajji" Alejandro (born December 26, 1954) is a Filipino singer and actor from Alaminos, Pangasinan, who was a major pop star in the 1970s and 1980s. Just like another OPM legend Basil Valdez, he came from the group Circus Band. He was the first winner of the Metro Manila Popular Music Festival.

Dubbed the "kilabot ng mga kolehiyala" (college girls' heartthrob),  Alejandro is best remembered for songs such as "Kay Ganda ng Ating Musika", "Panakíp Butas" and "Nakapagtataka".

Career
Hajji Alejandro began performing in 1976.

Political views
Alejandro, similar to his wife, is a supporter of former President Ferdinand Marcos, even after his deposition in the People Power Revolution.

Personal life
In the 1980s, Alejandro operated a small restaurant along Melrose Avenue in Los Angeles, California with his wife, beauty queen and actress Rio Diaz. They have a son, Delara drummer Ali Alejandro. Rio Diaz died of colorectal cancer in October 2004.

Alejandro is also the father of singer Rachel Alejandro.

Discography

Albums
18 Greatest Hits
Collection
Pagbabalik (1992)
25: The Silver Anniversary Album Of Hajji Alejandro

Singles
"Panakip Butas" (1977; Tagalog cover of "Worst That Could Happen" by The 5th Dimension) - Alejandro re-recorded the song for his Silver Anniversary Album released by Sony BMG Music in 1996
"May Minamahal" (1977) - Alejandro re-recorded the song for his Silver Anniversary Album released by Sony BMG Music in 1996
"Tag-Araw, Tag-Ulan" (1977; Tagalog cover of "Charade" by the Bee Gees) - Alejandro re-recorded the song for his Silver Anniversary Album in 1996.
"Ang Lahat Na Ito'y Para sa 'Yo" - Alejandro re-recorded the song for his Silver Anniversary Album released in 1996
"Kay Ganda ng Ating Musika" (1978; original composition by Ryan Cayabyab; Grand Prize Winner, 1st Metro Manila Popular Music Festival & Seoul Song Festival)
"Nakapagtataka" (1978; original composition by Jim Paredes)

See also
Rico J. Puno
Rey Valera
Freddie Aguilar
Marco Sison
Nonoy Zuñiga

References

1954 births
Living people
Filipino male film actors
20th-century Filipino male singers
Filipino pop musicians
Filipino male television actors